The Philadelphia School of Circus Arts (PSCA) is a contemporary circus school in Philadelphia. It began in June 2008.

The curriculum includes aerial skills, such as static trapeze, corde lisse or rope, lyra) and juggling, unicycling, tightwire, tumbling, Chinese acrobatics, physical conditioning and other circus arts. Class sessions run four times per year, for eight weeks per session. Classes are for all ages, ranging from children 18 months and older, to adults of any age.

In addition to ongoing classes, PSCA offers introductory workshops that are around one hour in length. They introduce potential students to aerials, circus arts, or children's circus arts. These special workshops require no prior experience in circus arts or formal training. The workshops also provide a forum for participants to try out aerials, circus arts and children's circus arts without the commitment of an eight-week session.

PSCA has expanded from a school where one can learn circus arts to a performing arts organization that offers performances on-site and in the community. PSCA is a regular participant in the Philadelphia International Children's Festival, Philadelphia Folk Festival, the Chestnut Hill Fall for Arts festival, and other community celebrations. The school presents an annual fall cabaret performance every November. PSCA is also participating in the Kimmel Center for the Arts "Philadelphia International Festival of the Arts" in spring, 2011. The school is also the home to several performances that are part of the Philadelphia Live Arts/Fringe Festival. In 2009, Philadelphia School of Circus Arts attracted 1,500 patrons to performances and events.

Summer camp
Every summer, PSCA presents summer camp for children of all ages. The Youth Camp gives children the opportunity to develop skills on the trapeze, aerial rope and silks, juggling, unicycling, plate-spinning, diabolo, devil sticks, tightwire, rolling globe, rola-bola, clowning and tumbling. The Youth Camp also includes activities such as dance and performance classes, student showtimes, lunchtimes in the park, co-operative games. Children must be seven years old and have completed the first grade to attend youth camp. Kindercamp is for children five to six years old. This one-week program places a greater emphasis on play and exploration. Children will learn how to do trapeze, aerial rope and silks, feather-balancing, scarf-juggling, plate-spinning, tightwire, rolling globe, tumbling and obstacle courses. The camp also includes playground visits, arts and crafts projects, as well as rest time.

Additional activities at the PSCA studio include children's birthday parties, wedding and social events, private lessons, corporate team-building workshops, guest workshops, and school vacation activities.

Coaches
The Head coach currently at PSCA is Adam Woolley. He is on the Board of Directors of American Youth Circus Organization and works as Safety Program Manager for the American Circus Educators Association. In addition, he is a sought-after corde and silks instructor. Terry Brennan works as a Parkour instructor and Youth Circus Instructor. He is also head of the PSCA "Youth Troupe". Aerial instructors include: Adam, Rachel Lancaster, Christine Morano, Shannon Sexton, Megan Gendall, Fenix Cobbledick, Karen Ladd, Molly Wright, and Eric Micheals. Many instructors specialize in acrobatics, handstands, or juggling, like Nicole Burgio and Richard Kennisson. All of the coaches have professional education in circus and/or a long history in its practice.

Performances
PSCA puts on several shows and performances annually, both in and out of the school itself. They have Student showcases twice a year for adult students and once for younger students in a "Youth Soirée". in addition to these, many of the staff member at the school participate in gigs and traveling performances throughout the year. The smaller youth group called PSCA's "Youth Troop" coordinates many shows throughout the greater Philadelphia area. Some students may also coordinate shows with other schools, like the Pennsylvania Academy of Ballet.

History
PSCA was founded by Shana Kennedy, who is the owner of PSCA along with her husband, Greg Kennedy. Greg is an internationally renowned juggler, who was in Cirque du Soliel's Totem from 2010-2014. Kennedy trained as an aerialist and a juggler at Circomedia, in England.

She began teaching aerial skills in her home's backyard in 2001. In 2006, Kennedy formed Air Play, which would become a performance and teaching company. In 2008, Kennedy opened the full-fledged school facility known today as Philadelphia School of Circus Arts. The school's Coordinating Director is Kitsie O'Niel. The school attracts students are all ages and all levels, coming from the local area (Germantown, Mt. Airy, Chestnut Hill, Philadelphia, South Jersey) all the way to New York City. The studio space is located in a renovated church sanctuary with peak 40-foot ceilings, rigging points for 18 pieces of aerial equipment, and an expanse of wood flooring. Directly below the sanctuary is a  gymnasium with 17-foot ceilings. Additionally, there is an attached school building which holds 10 separate classrooms.

PSCA is an affiliate member of the Theatre Alliance of Greater Philadelphia. In 2010, PSCA was named "Best Children's Entertainment Winner" by the voters and readers of MyPHL17 Hotlist/Cityvoter for children's entertainment. In 2009, PSCA was named "Best of Philadelphia" by Philadelphia Magazine for children's classes.

People have traveled from as far as Brooklyn, New York and Wilmington, Delaware, to attend the school.

Similar schools
Other circus schools include Aloft Loft in Chicago, Circus Center in San Francisco, and Aircraft in Boston; the latter was founded by Jill Maio, who was trained by Kennedy.

References

External links

Circus schools
Schools in Philadelphia
Northwest Philadelphia